The Bentley T-series is a luxury automobile produced by Bentley Motors Limited in the United Kingdom from 1965 to 1980. It was announced and displayed for the first time at the Paris Motor Show on 5 October 1965 as a Bentley-badged version of the totally redesigned Rolls-Royce Silver Shadow.

The Bentley T series was available as a four-door saloon and as a long wheelbase four-door saloon. A small number of two-door saloons were built with coachwork by James Young and Mulliner Park Ward and a two-door convertible with coachwork by Mulliner Park Ward was introduced in September 1967.

Design
The T series was the first unibodied Bentley, and was totally different from its predecessor the S series.  It featured a new steel and aluminium monocoque body with subframes to mount the engine and suspension.  While smaller overall, it had more passenger room, particularly in the rear compartment, yet more luggage space. Overall the car was  shorter,  lower,  narrower, and  lighter than the S.

Because of being fitted with the traditional round-shouldered "Bentley" style front grille – its sole material styling difference from the Rolls-Royce Silver Shadow – it was also 5 inches lower at bonnet height, giving it a slightly more assertive look.

The 'T' also featured independent suspension on all four wheels with automatic height control according to loading.  Other major improvements included disc brakes on all wheels (with a triplicate hydraulic braking system patented from Citroën that also supplied pressure for the self leveling suspension); new and lighter power steering, improved automatic transmission, eight-way adjustable electric front seats, and a larger fuel tank.

In October 1966, the T saloon's pretax 'list price' of £5425 was £50 less than the Silver Shadow.

Image
The formerly more sporting image of Bentley motor cars differing from Rolls-Royces was long gone and far from being renewed by the time the Bentley T was introduced. Effectively, the two were indistinguishable.

T2
The T was upgraded to the "T2" in 1977, which featured rack and pinion steering, improved air conditioning, rubber-faced bumpers, a new fascia and for Non USA Spec. cars a front air dam. Bosch CIS Fuel Injection was introduced for late 1979 and 1980 models for the US and other markets, similarly to the Rolls-Royce Silver Shadow II.

The T2 was discontinued in 1980.

Production of Bentley T-Series

Note: 15 examples of the Two Door Saloon were built with coachwork by James Young and the remainder with coachwork by Mulliner Park Ward.

References

T-series
1970s cars
1980s cars
Cars introduced in 1965